Winston Wilde is a sexologist, psychotherapist, and author living in Los Angeles, California. He is the surviving partner of writer Paul Monette (1945–1995).  Wilde's book, Legacies of Love: A Heritage of Queer Bonding, chronicling famous queer relationships with pictures and texts, was published in 2007 after 14 years of research.

Work
Bibliography

Contributor

Filmography
 Paul Monette: The Brink of Summer's End (1996) as himself 
 A Girl's Guide to 21st Century Sex - TV Episode #1.6 (2006) as himself

References

Year of birth missing (living people)
Living people
American educators
American relationships and sexuality writers
American male non-fiction writers
American gay writers